Uzbekistan Second League (Uzbek: O'zbekiston Ikkinchi ligasi / Ўзбекистон Иккинчи лигаси; Russian: Вторая лига Узбекистана) is the fourth level (after the Super League, Pro League and Pro B League) football league in Uzbekistan. 

Held under the auspices of Uzbekistan Professional Football League (UzPFL), and is controlled by the Uzbekistan Football Federation (UFF) and its regional offices. 

The tournament is usually held in late November or early December. It involves the winners of the regional leagues of Uzbekistan, winners of some of the most strong regional and city leagues in the country, as well as the team took the last place in the Pro League of Uzbekistan (until 2017 this league was called the Uzbekistan First League). 

The winners (usually two to four teams) are receiving vouchers in Uzbekistan Pro League. In the first round of the league, usually teams are divided into groups and the group winners get a ticket to the next round — in round of the playoffs. The winners of the round of the playoffs receive vouchers in the Pro League. In some seasons the teams were split into groups and the group winners and the team which took the second place received a direct ticket to the league of higher rank (regional and city championships).

External links
Championat.uz: Standings and results
pfl.uz: Uzbekistan Professional League

     
4
Fourth level football leagues in Asia
Sports leagues established in 1992
1992 establishments in Uzbekistan